Cerithiopsis vitrea is a species of sea snail, a gastropod in the family Cerithiopsidae. It was described by Dall, in 1927.

Description 
The maximum recorded shell length is 6.5 mm.

Habitat 
Minimum recorded depth is 538 m. Maximum recorded depth is 805 m.

References

vitrea
Gastropods described in 1927